Man of Straw is a British television drama series which first aired on BBC 2 between 30 January and 5 March 1972. It is an adaptation of the 1918 novel Der Untertan by Heinrich Mann. It takes place during the final years of Wilhelmine Germany.

Main cast
 Derek Jacobi as  Diederich Hessling (6 episodes) 
 John Phillips as  Dr. Heuteufel (5 episodes) 
 Denis Carey as  Sotbier (4 episodes)
 Judy Cornwell as  Guste Daimchen (4 episodes)
 Elizabeth Bell as  Emmi Hessling (3 episodes)
 Sheila Brennan as  Frau Hessling (3 episodes)
 Dave Hill as  Napoleon Fischer (3 episodes)
 Judy Loe as  Katchen Zillich (3 episodes)
 Karin MacCarthy as  Magda Hessling (3 episodes)
 Ian Ogilvy as  Wolfgang Buck (3 episodes) 
 John Savident as  Von Wulchow (3 episodes) 
 Juliet Aykroyd as  Agnes Goppel (2 episodes) 
 Sam Dastor as  Dr. Judassohn (2 episodes)
 Mike Fields as  Virsing (2 episodes) 
 Derek Francis as 	 Herr Goppel (2 episodes)
 Harry Hutchinson as  Judge Sarding (2 episodes) 
 David King as  Burgermeister Scheffelweis (2 episodes)
 Stanley Lebor as  Herr Cohn (2 episodes)
 Stuart McGugan as  Fox Major (2 episodes)
 Eve Pearce as Judith Lauer (2 episodes)
 Sean Roantree as  Wiebel (2 episodes)
 Cyril Shaps as  Herr Lauer (2 episodes)
 Brian Stirner as Hernung (2 episodes)
 Manning Wilson as  Pastor Zillich (2 episodes)

References

Bibliography
Ellen Baskin. Serials on British Television, 1950-1994. Scolar Press, 1996.

External links
 

BBC television dramas
1972 British television series debuts
1972 British television series endings
English-language television shows
Television shows based on German novels